Upper Campbell Lake is a reservoir on Vancouver Island in British Columbia, Canada. Crest Creek and headwaters of the Heber River are diverted into the lake. Part of the lake and its watershed is located in Strathcona Provincial Park, and the Strathcona Park Lodge is located on the eastern side. Freshwater fish species in the lake include Cutthroat trout, Rainbow trout and Dolly varden.

Geography 

Its main tributaries are the Elk River, and the Tlools, Filberg, Cervis and Drum Creeks. Its only outflow is Campbell River, which also flows in from its headwaters nearby at Buttle Lake. The river flows a short distance out of Upper Campbell Lake via the Strathcona Dam into Lower Campbell Lake. Upper Campbell Lake lies in the Coastal Western Hemlock Biogeoclimatic Zone.

History 
The damming of the lake also significantly raised the level of the Elk River, another main inflow, which destroyed a large area of elk habitat and has negatively impacted the river function. The flooding removed an estimated 65% of the spawning habitat used by sport fish in the tributaries of the lake.

References 

Lakes of Vancouver Island
Lakes of British Columbia
Comox Land District